As part of the local elections in Wales on 4 May 2017, the 42 seats of Blaenau Gwent County Borough Council were up for election. The majority of members elected were independents, replacing the previous Labour administration.

Election Result

|}

Ward results

Abertillery

Badminton

Beaufort

Blaina

Brynmawr

Cwm

Cwmtillery

Ebbw Vale North

Ebbw Vale South

Georgetown

Llanhilleth

Nantyglo

Rassau

Sirhowy

Six Bells

Tredegar Central & West

Changes between 2017 and 2021 
In March 2018 Gareth Davies (Cwm), Plaid Cymru's only councillor in the area, resigned from the party.

References

Blaenau Gwent
2017